Ranger is a city in Eastland County, Texas, United States. Its population was 2,468 at the 2010 census. Ranger College, a community college, is the second-largest employer in the community.

During the 1920s, Ranger, like nearby Cisco, Eastland, and Desdemona, was a petroleum boomtown.

History
The Texas Pacific Coal Company of Thurber, Texas, drilled a gas well north of Ranger in August 1917, after town civic leaders offered acreage in return for four test wells. Then on 11 October 1917, the McClesky well, 1 mile southwest of Ranger, produced oil at 1200 BOPD. The Ranger Oil Field production peaked in July 1919 at 80,000 BOPD. The oil boom brought many seeking jobs, including farm boys and demobilized veterans.

Geography

Ranger is located in northeastern Eastland County at  (32.470102, –98.676734). Interstate 20 passes south and east of the city, with access from Exits 349, 351, 352, and 354. I-20 leads east  to Fort Worth and west  to Abilene.

Ranger Antique Airfield dates back to 1911. Pilot Amelia Earhart landed at the field in 1931 in her Pitcairn Autogyro. Ranger Airfield has two grass runways: 1/19 – 3400 x 80 ft and 17/35; 1950 x 60 ft.

Climate

The climate in this area is characterized by hot, humid summers and generally mild to cool winters.  According to the Köppen climate classification, Ranger has a humid subtropical climate, Cfa on climate maps.

Demographics

2020 census

As of the 2020 United States census, there were 2,300 people, 1,017 households, and 516 families residing in the city.

2000 census
As of the census of 2000,  2,584 people, 989 households, and 616 families resided in the city. The population density was 369.0 people per square mile (142.5/km). The 1,214 housing units averaged 173.4 per square mile (67.0/km). The racial makeup of the city was 84.83% White, 6.73% African American, 0.66% Native American, 0.43% Asian, 5.65% from other races, and 1.70% from two or more races. Hispanics or Latinos of any race were 13.51% of the population.

Of the 989 households, 28.0% had children under the age of 18 living with them, 43.7% were married couples living together, 14.7% had a female householder with no husband present, and 37.7% were not families. About 34.5% of all households were made up of individuals, and 18.7% had someone living alone who was 65 years of age or older. The average household size was 2.33 and the average family size was 3.00.

In the city, the age distribution was 22.7% under  18, 17.4% from 18 to 24, 20.9% from 25 to 44, 19.4% from 45 to 64, and 19.7% who were 65 or older. The median age was 36 years. For every 100 females, there were 97.1 males. For every 100 females age 18 and over, there were 93.8 males.

The median income for a household in the city was $22,500, and for a family was $28,255. Males had a median income of $24,333 versus $15,946 for females. The per capita income for the city was $11,698. About 14.4% of families and 18.3% of the population were below the poverty line, including 19.1% of those under age 18 and 17.8% of those age 65 or over.

Education
The city is served by the Ranger Independent School District and home to the Ranger High School Bulldogs, 1953 state football champions (Class 1A).  The city is also home to Ranger College.

Notable people
Stephen Arterburn, Evangelical Christian author and spokesman
Bobby Cross, American football player
Buster Mills, baseball player
Ted Neeley, actor best known for playing the title role in the film Jesus Christ Superstar
Bob Smith, American football player
Eve Southern, actress
Walter Prescott Webb, eminent Texas, Western and Great Plains historian

Photo gallery

References

Cities in Eastland County, Texas
Cities in Texas